The 2016 America East Conference women's soccer tournament is the postseason women's soccer tournament for the America East Conference to be held from October 27 to November 6, 2016. The five match tournament will be held at campus sites, with the higher seed hosting. The six team single-elimination tournament will consist of three rounds based on seeding from regular season conference play. The Albany Great Danes are the defending tournament champions, after defeating the Hartford Hawks 2–1 in the championship match for the program's first league title.

Bracket

Schedule

First Round

Semifinals

Final

References 
2016 America East Conference Women's Soccer Championship

 
America East Conference Women's Soccer Tournament